= Ghoradia =

Ghoradia Sauria
- Village
- Location in Odisha, India Ghoradia (India)
- Coordinates: 20.10298°N 85.73385°E
- Country: India
- State: Odisha
- Time zone: UTC+5:30 (IST)

Ghoradia (Sauria) is a village in Puri district in the state of Odisha, India. Ghoradia is a village in Delanga Tehsil in Puri District of Odisha State, India. It is located 37 km towards North from District headquarters Puri. 5 km from Delanga. 30 km from State capital Bhubaneswar

Ghoradia Pin code is 752015 and postal head office is Delang .

Muninda ( 4 km ), Kalyanpur ( 5 km ), Trilochanapur ( 5 km ), Sujanpur ( 6 km ), Beraboi ( 7 km ) are the nearby Villages to Sauria. Sauria is surrounded by Jatni Tehsil towards North, Kanas Tehsil towards South, Khordha Tehsil towards west, Pipili Tehsil towards East .

Jatani, Khordha, Bhubaneswar, Puri are the nearby Cities to Ghoradia.

This Place is in the border of the Puri District and Khordha District. Khordha District Jatni is North towards this place .

This village is situated in the bank of River Daya. People of different religions such as Hindu, Muslim live here together.

"Dayanachori Yatra" is a famous festival celebrated for three days by all the people staying in the village.

There is a folk tale behind the naming of this village. In the past, when king used to go with his army and horses, they had to pass a canal situated near this place. The horses had to jump that canal in order to move ahead. In odia language, horse is called "Ghoda" and jump is called "Dian". Hence the place name is "Ghodadian". But when the Britishers invaded this village, they could not pronounce the name and started calling it Ghoraria which gradually became "Ghoradia".
